On the web, an interstitial webpage (or interstitial) is a web page displayed before or after an expected content page, often to display advertising or for regulatory reasons, such as to confirm the user's age (prior to showing age-restricted material) or obtain consent to store cookies. Most interstitial advertisements are delivered by an ad server.

Some people take issue with the use of such pages to present online advertising before allowing users to see the content they were trying to access.

Meaning of interstitial

In this context, "interstitial" is used in the sense of “in-between”.  The interstitial web page sits between a referenced page and the page which references it—hence it is in between two pages. This is distinct from a page which simply links directly to another, in that the interstitial page serves only to provide extra information to a user during the act of navigating from one page to the next.

In digital marketing, the term “interstitial” is often used in the sense of “interstitial advertising”, rather than “interstitial webpage”. In some cases, this may lead to confusion because interstitial ads are not always served on interstitial web pages. According to a standard advanced by the IAB, an interstitial (also known as a between-the-page ad) can either be displayed on a separate webpage or appear briefly as an overlay on the destination page. Moreover, mobile advertising guidelines created by the Mobile Marketing Association (MMA) include in-app interstitial ads, that are integrated into applications, rather than web pages.

Circumvention
Many interstitial pages are circumvented by NoScript and ad blockers.

See also
 Ad blocker
 Ad server, the technology that delivers most online advertisements
 AdBlock, a tool to prevent the display of online advertisements
 Adobe Flash, a technology similar in its application for online advertising.
 Modal window
 Pop-up ad

References

External links
 Google interstitial references

Web design
Online advertising methods